Relentless 3 is a 1993 crime thriller film written and directed by James Lemmo. The tagline for the film was: "When the fear stops...you're dead!" Relentless 3 was filmed in Los Angeles, California, USA. It is the third installment in the Relentless series.

The film was referenced twice on Saturday Night Live. The first time in 1993 on the Jeff Goldblum, Aerosmith #19.3  episode as a poster on the counter in "Karl’s Video Store" and again on The Best of David Spade in 1995, again a poster on the counter in the same store.

Plot
Sam Dietz returns to Los Angeles from "up North" and agrees to consult on a serial killer case. Not wanting to be more involved changes however, when the killer targets Dietz's latest love interest, thereby, forcing him to become actively involved in the investigation. The killer is someone he's arrested before.

Cast
 Leo Rossi as Sam Dietz
 William Forsythe as Walter Hilderman
 Robert Costanzo as Roy Kalewsky
 Edward Wiley as Lt Muldowney
 Tom Bower as Captain Phelan
 Savannah Smith Boucher as Marianne
 Stacy Edwards as Toni Keely
 Mindy Seeger as Francine
 George Tovar as Detective Santos
 Jack Knight as Detective Schulte
 Felton Perry as Detective Ziskie
 Charles Dennis as Detective Cirrillo
 Signy Coleman as Paula
 Diane Rodrigues as Angry Woman
 Jay Arlen Jones as Angry Man
 Brendan Ryan as Corey Dietz

Home media
The film was released directly to videocassette on August 18, 1993. In 2006, Image Entertainment released a double feature DVD containing this and the fourth film. Both films are presented in widescreen.

Other films in the series 
 Relentless (1989)
 Dead On: Relentless II (1992)
 Relentless IV: Ashes to Ashes (1994)

References

External links
 
 

American sequel films
1993 crime thriller films
1993 films
American police detective films
CineTel Films films
American crime thriller films
1990s English-language films
Films directed by James Lemmo
1990s American films